Trident University International is a private for-profit online university based in Cypress, California. It is a member of the American InterContinental University System, and regionally accredited by the Higher Learning Commission.

Trident offers five doctoral degrees, eight master's degrees, 8 bachelor's degrees, one associate degree, and six professional certificate and diplomas programs. As of 2014, enrollment included about 75% military personnel.

History
Founded in 1998, it has its headquarters in Cypress, California. Currently the university has more than 30,000 alumni.

Trident at AIU's story starts with its founding as Touro University International, a branch campus of Touro College, in July 1998, by its founders Dr. Yoram Neumann and Edith Neumann. It was the first university in the world to offer a regionally accredited doctorate program online with no residency requirement. Touro University International was initially accredited by the Middle States Commission on Higher Education (MSCHE). Touro College, including the Touro University International branch campus, was subsequently re-accredited by MSCHE in 2004. Because of its location in California, robust growth, fiscal and operational stability, and unique online delivery model, Touro University International was separately accredited by the Western Association of Schools and Colleges (WASC) [Now called the WASC Senior College and University Commission (WSCUC)] in February 2005.

In October 2007, Touro University International was sold to Summit Partners for 190 million dollars and a new institution, TUI University (now Trident at AIU) was formed and incorporated as a private for profit. Under the new ownership, the management team continued to lead the institution while the learning model, faculty, and staff maintain their central roles in the quality and vitality of the university. In January 2011, TUI University officially changed its name to Trident University International. On March 29, 2015, Jones International University (JIU) announced it would close in 2016 and that it had entered into a formal transfer agreement with Trident University International that would provide all JIU students with individualized, custom learning plans and the opportunity to transition their studies to Trident. Trident also announced plans to rename its business school The Glenn R. Jones College of Business Administration. In March 2019, Career Education Corporation entered into an agreement to acquire Trident University International for $35 – 44 million from Summit Partners and merged this acquisition into Career Education Corporation's American InterContinental University as a branch campus. Trident at AIU was officially granted accreditation by the Higher Learning Commission on February 19, 2020. Trident withdrew accreditation from the Western Association of Schools and Colleges on March 2, 2020.

Investigations and controversies
In June 2011, the WSCUC Commission received information that Trident awarded baccalaureate degrees to students who had not fulfilled the university's general education (GE) requirements. In addition, Trident failed to notify WSCUC of this problem when it was first brought to the institution's attention by the Servicemembers Opportunity College (SOCNAV), an organization that works with the United States Navy to assure that the colleges that Navy personnel attend are appropriately accredited and military friendly. Because of the serious breach of Standards One and Two related to integrity and general education, the Commission issued an Order to Show Cause why Trident's accreditation should not be terminated effective March 30, 2012. The following year, the commission confirmed that Trident had satisfactorily addressed the issues and reaffirmed Trident's accreditation.

As of 2015, Trident was under heightened cash monitoring by the United States Department of Education "to provide additional oversight of cash management."

In 2017, the Veterans Education Success organization alleged that Trident had used misleading information to recruit "survivors" who had Post-9/11 GI Bill benefits. Survivors are the children of a father or mother who was killed while on active duty and their widows or husbands.

On March 9, 2020, the Department of Veterans Affairs (VA) suspended G.I. Bill reimbursement eligibility for American InterContinental University and several other for-profit schools due to what the V.A. said were "erroneous, deceptive, or misleading enrollment and advertising practices", giving the schools 60 days to take "corrective action". Later that year, the VA reversed its action.

Academics
Trident at American InterContinental University is institutionally accredited by the Higher Learning Commission.

Trident offers undergraduate, graduate, and doctoral level degrees in a 100% online environment in the following colleges:

Glenn R. Jones College of Business
College of Education
College of Health and Human Services
College of Information Systems

Rankings
Trident University International placed #80 in Washington Monthly's 2019 National University Rankings Report and #19 in The Military Times Best: Colleges of 2018 for best online and nontraditional schools.

Student outcomes
According to the National Center for Education Statistics, Trident at AIU has a 6-year graduation rate of 19% and a 3-year default rate of 17 percent.

Notable alumni
 Robyn J. Blader, United States National Guard brigadier general
 William Gainey, United States Army Command Sergeant Major (R), the first senior enlisted advisor to the Joint Chiefs of Staff (SEAC)
 David O'Donahue, deputy adjutant general of the Wisconsin National Guard
 Kenneth Preston, 13th sergeant major of the Army
 Stephen Templin, bestselling author of "Seal Team Six"
 Tony Tinderholt, member of Texas House of Representatives
 John W. Troxell, United States Army Command sergeant major

See also
 List of colleges and universities in California

References

External links
 Official website

For-profit universities and colleges in the United States
Online colleges
Schools accredited by the Western Association of Schools and Colleges
Educational institutions established in 1998
1998 establishments in California
Touro University System
Distance education institutions based in the United States